Mohamed El-Sahrawi (born 2 February 1926) was an Egyptian rower. He competed in the men's coxed four event at the 1952 Summer Olympics.

References

External links
 

1926 births
Possibly living people
Egyptian male rowers
Olympic rowers of Egypt
Rowers at the 1952 Summer Olympics
Place of birth missing